Thorndale is a rural locality in the Southern Downs Region, Queensland, Australia. In the  Thorndale had a population of 150 people.

History 
Thorndale State School opened in 1915. It closed on 1924, after which it was moved to Spring Creek, Stanthorpe and renamed Greenlands State School.

A second Thorndale State School opened on 18 February 1946 and closed on 31 December 1964.

In the  Thorndale had a population of 150 people.

References 

Southern Downs Region
Localities in Queensland